Elaine Equi (born 1953) is an American poet.

Equi was born in Oak Park, Illinois and grew up in the Chicago area. Since 1988 she has lived in New York City with her husband, poet Jerome Sala. She currently teaches creative writing in the Master of Fine Arts programs at City College of New York and The New School. Widely published, her poems have appeared in The New Yorker, American Poetry Review, and numerous volumes of The Best American Poetry. In April 2007  Coffee House Press published Ripple Effect: New and Selected Poems. Also in 2007 she edited a special section for Jacket Magazine: The Holiday Album: Greeting Card Poems For All Occasions.

She is a second cousin of Albert Guidi of Chicago.

Works 

 Federal Woman (Danaides, 1978)
 Shrewcrazy (Little Caeser, 1981)
The Corners of the Mouth (Iridescence, 1986)
 Accessories (Figures, 1988)
 Views Without Rooms (Hanuman Books, 1989)
 Surface Tension (Coffee House, 1989)
 Decoy (Coffee House, 1994)
 Friendship with Things (Figures, 1998)
 Voice-Over (Coffee House, 1999)
 The Cloud of Knowable Things (Coffee House, 2003)
 Ripple Effect: New and Selected Poems (Coffee House, 2007) (shortlisted for the 2008 International Griffin Poetry Prize)
 Click and Clone (Coffee House, 2011)
 Sentences and Rain (Coffee House, 2015)

Resources

External links 

Poetry
Bent Orbit at Academy of American Poets
National Poetry Month at The Academy of American Poets
Two poems at Conjunctions
Five poems at Coconut
Two poems at MiPoesias
Three poems at The Cortland Review
 Out of the Cloud Chamber
A Lemon at Lacanian Ink
Two poems at Shampoo
Courtesans Lounging at 3rd Bed
Preface at The Figures
The Long Forever at PoemMemoirStory
Griffin Poetry Prize biography
Griffin Poetry Prize reading, including video clip

Prose
Frank O'Hara—Nothing Personal an essay at Conjunctions
The Dirty Poems of Frank O'Hara an essay (scroll down) at PoetrySociety.org
Interview at MiPoesias
The Poetry of Ed Ruscha Examines Ed Ruscha's “word art” and other minimalist poetic forms. From Jacket Magazine.
 Elaine Equi and Jerome Sala Papers at Fales Library and Special Collections at New York University Special Collections

1953 births
Living people
American women poets
Poets from Illinois
City College of New York alumni
20th-century American poets
20th-century American women writers
21st-century American women